The Bloch MB.800 was a French low-wing monoplane three-seat trainer / mailplane developed by Société des Avions Marcel Bloch. It was of all-wood construction.

Variants
Data from: Dassault Aviation
MB 800 P3the first aircraft, a three-seat flying trainer to a P3 specification, powered by two  Bloch 6B-1 6-cylinder engines.
MB 800 T3the second aircraft, a three-seat crew trainer to a T3 specification, was under construction in 1939.
MB 800P 'Biarritz'the third aircraft, a mailplane, completed during WWII as the Sud-Ouest SO.80 / Sud-Ouest SO.800, powered by two  Béarn 6D engines.

Specifications

See also

References

MB.800
Low-wing aircraft
Aircraft first flown in 1940
Twin piston-engined tractor aircraft
1940s French aircraft